Toni Breidinger (born July 14, 1999) is an American professional stock car racing driver & Victoria's Secret Model who competes part-time for Venturini Motorsports in the ARCA Menards Series, driving the No. 55 Toyota Camry.

She was the female driver with the most wins in United States Auto Club (USAC) history with 19.

Racing career

Early career

Breidinger began racing go-karts at the age of nine with her twin sister Annie in 2009 at Sonoma Raceway. Her father bought the sisters a go-kart after they started going to a local go-karting facility and had fun racing there. He bought one go-kart and eventually a second so each of them had their own.

ARCA and NASCAR

She was called by Venturini Motorsports to run a part-time schedule for them in the ARCA Series in 2018.

Breidinger returned to ARCA in 2021 on a part-time schedule for Young's Motorsports beginning at Daytona International Speedway. The team also announced that Breidinger would run a part-time schedule in the NASCAR Camping World Truck Series that year, driving the No. 82, a new part-time fourth truck for the team. This would have made her the first female Arab-American driver to compete in a NASCAR national series. Her Truck Series debut did not end up happening because she left Young's Motorsports in July to return to Venturini Motorsports, where she was announced to compete for them in 4 main ARCA Menards Series races along with the West Series season-finale at Phoenix.

W Series
In 2019, Breidinger tried out for the W Series, a new racing series composed exclusively of female drivers from around the world. She first announced her intentions to become an applicant for the series in December 2018 (along with Natalie Decker, her 2018 teammate at Venturini). Breidinger was named to be among the top-50 finalists, though she was eventually cut from the program.

Late models
In 2017, she ran various Late model races throughout the state of California as a teammate to Hailie Deegan.

In March 2019, Breidinger signed with GMS Racing to compete in several late model events for them. She also became part of the Drivers Edge Development program which is composed of up-and-coming drivers from both GMS and JR Motorsports.

In 2020, Breidinger competed in Carolina Pro Late Model Series, for DLP Motorsports driving the 80 car. She placed 4th in points.  In the 8 races in the series she placed 3 Top 5s, and 4 Top 10s.

Personal life
Breidinger is of Lebanese and German descent; her family lives in Hillsborough, California. She has a twin sister named Annie who is also a racing driver and has competed in go-karts and USAC along with Toni. She has also done some modeling.

Breidinger appeared on The Ellen DeGeneres Show on February 25, 2021, to discuss her 2021 season plans, her run in the ARCA race at Daytona which happened two weeks prior, and her racing career as a whole. She became the first NASCAR driver that was not from the NASCAR Cup Series to appear as a guest on the show.

On September 14th, 2022 Breidinger announced on Instagram that she was hired to be a model for Victora's Secret.

Motorsports career results

ARCA Menards Series
(key) (Bold – Pole position awarded by qualifying time. Italics – Pole position earned by points standings or practice time. * – Most laps led.)

ARCA Menards Series East

ARCA Menards Series West

Carolina Pro Late Model Series
(key)

 Season still in progress

References

External links

 
 Breidinger Motorsports website
 

1999 births
Living people
NASCAR drivers
ARCA Menards Series drivers
Racing drivers from California
Racing drivers from San Francisco
People from Hillsborough, California
American female racing drivers
Twin sportspeople
American twins
American people of Lebanese descent
American people of German descent
Sportspeople of Lebanese descent
21st-century American women
USAC Silver Crown Series drivers